Talmei, a Hebrew word meaning furrows, may refer to the following places in Israel:

Talmei Bilu
Talmei Elazar
Talmei Eliyahu
Talmei Yaffe
Talmei Yehiel
Talmei Yosef